Eleutherodactylus guanahacabibes is a species of frogs in the family Eleutherodactylidae endemic to Cuba, and is named for the Guanahacabibes Peninsula. Its natural habitats are subtropical or tropical moist lowland forest, rocky areas, and caves.
It is threatened by habitat loss.

References

guanahacabibes
Amphibians described in 1985
Endemic fauna of Cuba
Amphibians of Cuba
Taxonomy articles created by Polbot